Nycteola metaspilella, the forgotten frigid owlet, is a nolid moth (family Nolidae). The species was first described by Francis Walker in 1866. It is found in North America.

The MONA or Hodges number for Nycteola metaspilella is 8978.

References

Further reading

External links
 

Chloephorinae
Articles created by Qbugbot
Moths described in 1866